Defending champion Novak Djokovic defeated Roger Federer in a rematch of the previous year's final, 7–6(7–1), 6–7(10–12), 6–4, 6–3 to win the gentlemen's singles tennis title at the 2015 Wimbledon Championships. It was his third Wimbledon title and ninth major title overall. Federer was vying to become the first man to win Wimbledon eight times (a feat he would achieve in 2017), and became the first man in the Open Era to reach 10 finals at the same major.

2002 champion Lleyton Hewitt made his final Wimbledon singles appearance, losing to Jarkko Nieminen (who was also playing in his final Wimbledon) in the first round.

In the second round, 102nd-ranked Dustin Brown upset the two-time champion Rafael Nadal. Brown previously defeated Nadal at the 2014 Gerry Weber Open in Halle, the only other time the two had played each other. This marked the fourth straight year in which Nadal suffered an early-round exit from the tournament by losing to a player ranked 100 or lower.

This was the first major since the 2002 US Open where then-world No. 8 David Ferrer did not participate (due to an elbow injury), ending his streak of 50 consecutive major appearances.

This was also the first major main draw appearance for future two-time ATP Finals champion and Olympic gold medalist Alexander Zverev; he lost to Denis Kudla in the second round.

Seeds

  Novak Djokovic (champion)
  Roger Federer (final)
  Andy Murray (semifinals)
  Stan Wawrinka (quarterfinals)
  Kei Nishikori (second round, withdrew due to a calf injury)
  Tomáš Berdych (fourth round)
  Milos Raonic (third round)
  David Ferrer (withdrew with an elbow injury; replaced by Luca Vanni)
  Marin Čilić (quarterfinals)
  Rafael Nadal (second round)
  Grigor Dimitrov (third round)
  Gilles Simon (quarterfinals)
  Jo-Wilfried Tsonga (third round)
  Kevin Anderson (fourth round)
  Feliciano López (second round)
  David Goffin (fourth round)

  John Isner (third round)
  Gaël Monfils (third round)
  Tommy Robredo (first round)
  Roberto Bautista Agut (fourth round)
  Richard Gasquet (semifinals)
  Viktor Troicki (fourth round)
  Ivo Karlović (fourth round)
  Leonardo Mayer (third round)
  Andreas Seppi (third round)
  Nick Kyrgios (fourth round)
  Bernard Tomic (third round)
  Pablo Cuevas (first round)
  Guillermo Garcia-Lopez (first round)
  Fabio Fognini (second round)
  Jack Sock (first round)
  Dominic Thiem (second round)

Qualifying

Draw

Finals

Top half

Section 1

Section 2

Section 3

Section 4

Bottom half

Section 5

Section 6

Section 7

Section 8

Nationalities in the field

References

External links
 Main draw
 2015 Wimbledon Championships – Men's draws and results at the International Tennis Federation

2015 Wimbledon Championships
Wimbledon Championship by year – Men's singles